Shunacadie (Scottish Gaelic: An Acarsaid, meaning "the harbour") is a community in the Canadian province of Nova Scotia, located in the Cape Breton Regional Municipality on Cape Breton Island.

Communities in the Cape Breton Regional Municipality
General Service Areas in Nova Scotia